The Kenya National Bureau of Statistics (KNBS) is a department in Kenya's Ministry of Planning  which collects and compiles regular cross-sectoral data for the government.  The Bureau was established through the Statistics Act of 2006 and initiated in February 2007. The office places staff in other departments of the Kenya Government to collect data. The headquarters is in Herufi House in Nairobi.

Programmes

Kenya Population and Housing Census 
In part, the National Bureau of Statistics oversees the Kenya Population and Housing Census, which occurs every ten years. The most recent census was in 2019, and documents the population of country. An audit by the Auditor General's office published in 2021 found that  half of the KSh 18.5 billion  budget of the Kenya Population and Housing Census for the 2019 census, could not be accounted for.

National Sampling Survey and Evaluation Programme 
The  National Sampling Survey and Evaluation Programme is a household data collection program.

References

External links 
 Kenya National Bureau of Statistics homepage

Government agencies of Kenya